Events from the year 1603 in Germany.

Births
 Louise Juliane of Erbach
 John, Count of Nassau-Idstein
 Stephan Otto
 David Denicke
 Johann Sperling
 Caspar Kittel

Deaths
 John VII, Count of Oldenburg
 Johannes Herold
 Elisabeth of Nassau-Dillenburg
 Hermann Wilken
 Merga Bien

 
1600s in the Holy Roman Empire